Anatoliy Kokush (born 1951, Kerch, RSFSR) is a Ukrainian film engineer, businessman, and inventor. In 2005, he was awarded two Oscars. The awards were in the Scientific and Engineering Award category: one was awarded "for the concept and development of the Russian Arm gyro-stabilized camera crane and the Flight Head"; the other was awarded "for the concept and development of the Cascade series of motion picture cranes". Kokush has also been recognized by Ukraine's then–First Lady Kateryna Yushchenko for his contributions to Ukrainian cinema and around the world.

Kokush graduated from the Leningrad Institute of Film Engineers in 1974. He then started working for Dovzhenko Film Studios in Kyiv.

Gyro-stabilized car-mounted camera crane 
In the 1980s Kokush founded the Kyiv, Ukraine film and television company Filmotechnic. He explained that the machine known as the "Russian Arm" and "U-crane" is actually called Autorobot, and was given the nickname as a joke in the early nineties when Americans in Hollywood joked that "the Russian Arm is back in America again". Filmotechnic provided Travelling Cascade Cranes, Flight Heads and Russian arms to major Hollywood pictures such as Titanic, War of the Worlds, Casanova, and also the wuxia film Hero, many Russian blockbusters, as well as Ukrainian films. Other films include The Italian Job, Ocean's Twelve, King Arthur, Kingdom of Heaven, Bean: The Movie, Transformers, Iron Man 2, and many other huge box office hits.

References

External links 
 Official website of Filmotechnic
 «Кокуш U.Crane» (in Ukrainian)

Krymchaks
Living people
1951 births
20th-century Ukrainian engineers
Ukrainian inventors
20th-century Ukrainian businesspeople
Soviet engineers